Golspie is a village and parish in Sutherland, Highland, Scotland, which lies on the North Sea coast in the shadow of Ben Bhraggie. It has a population of around 1,350.

History

The name derives from the Norse for "gully village".

Planned village

During a series of visits from the Right Honourable Elizabeth Countess of Sutherland plans were drawn up for the regulations that were written in to future leases, imposing restrictions on the 'tacksmen' with regard to sub-setting and overstocking, and requiring them to adopt improving farming techniques. Consideration was also given to possible development of fishing villages on the east coast, the absence of any safe harbour being the greatest hindrance. Local fishermen used only small, light boats which could be drawn up onto the beach when not in use and this confined them to line fishing close to the shore. The herring fishing in the North Sea (at that time known as the German Ocean) was in the hands of the Dutch, who had a good fleet of decked vessels - the 'Holland Busses' - and it was hoped that some means could be found of developing a similar trade for the benefit of the people of Sutherland.

In one visit (between July and August 1805) the first plans were laid for Golspie village. The people were to get a 99-year lease for their houses, which they were to build themselves, but the croft ground was to be re-let annually, thus permitting changes in the layout of the village from time to time. In addition to the individual crofts, it was intended to provide common cow pasture.

One improvement was quickly made and that was the building of a little pier or jetty to provide a safe landing place for boats serving Dunrobin. In a letter to her husband the Countess described how she had caused intimation to be given at the Church door that forty men were wanted for the next week at the rate of 1/- a day, to build this jetty, using stones from the beach. The work was supervised by William Pope, who was being considered as a possible person to take charge of the proposed development of the harbours at Culgour and Helmsdale.

In April 1805 the Colonel Campbell submitted for Presbytery's approval a plan for a new schoolhouse in Golspie, the old one having been classed as ruinous the previous year.

Osprey, terns and swallows frequent the loch in summer. Rare wild flowers and plants can be seen in nearby Balblair Wood.

There are four hotels, several guesthouses and bed and breakfast premises as well as self-catering cottages. Dunrobin Castle, the seat of Clan Sutherland, is nearby and has falconry displays. There is a static caravan site. The Old Bank Road drill hall was completed in 1892.

Culture
Golspie hosted the National Mòd in 1977 and 1995.

The village has a Choral Group, Rotary Club, and dancing classes. At the start of August Golspie Gala Week is held. Among the 100 events staged throughout the week are a car-banger derby, a fancy dress parade, a wheelbarrow race and a parade of massed pipe bands as a finale. Golspie Heritage Society has a permanent home in the former Fisherman's Welcome on Station Road. The IT-equipped public library, open for limited periods four days weekly, is in the Community Centre complex adjoining the High School.

Hospital

There is a small hospital, The Lawson Memorial hospital, located just off the main road to the south of the centre of the village. Among other services, the hospital provides a pain clinic and offers pain intervention procedures as part of the Chronic Pain Management Service for the whole of the northern Highland Region.

Religion
The Church of Scotland and the Free Church of Scotland have well-established congregations, but the Roman Catholic Church and Scottish Episcopal Church worship in nearby Brora.

The parish church is officially St Andrew's Church, and contains the town graveyard.

Transport
Golspie railway station, on the Far North Line, opened in 1874. The converted station building is now a holiday let.

Buses operate about every two hours Mondays-Saturdays and infrequently on Sundays from Golspie to Dornoch, Tain and Inverness in the south and Brora, Helmsdale, Berriedale, Dunbeath, Halkirk, Thurso and Scrabster in the north.  These are on route X99 and are operated by Stagecoach Highlands, but tickets can be bought on the Citylink website.

Sport
Golspie has award-winning safe bathing beaches to the north and south of the tidal pier and there is also a public swimming pool in the centre of the village. The Kart Race Track is a mile or two down Ferry Road. The golf course has a mix of links, parkland and heath and there are central facilities for tennis and bowling, football and playing fields. Around Golspie there are opportunities for walking, bird watching and botany study, fossil-hunting and gorges and waterfalls. There is loch and sea angling, as well as sailing and yachting in the bay. In 2006 mountain bike trails were opened on the slopes of Beinn Bhragaidh.

The village's local football team, Golspie Sutherland currently plays in the North Caledonian Football Association, and is the joint most successful team in the league.

Notable people from Golspie
 William Fowler (architect) (1824–1906), who designed a high proportion of the public buildings in Golspie
 Adam Gunn (1872–1935), American athlete, was born in the village
 Lewis Williamson (1989–), Formula Renault driver
 Jimmy Yuill (1956–), Royal Shakespeare Company actor
 Rev James Maxwell Joass (1830–1914), geologist, archaeologist and antiquarian, minister of Golspie from 1866 to 1914

References

Further reading
Golspie: Contributions to its Folklore, 1887, Annie and Bella Cumming and others.

 
Populated places in Sutherland